Cyril Maples Hibberd (8 May 1895 – 1980) was an English footballer who played as a goalkeeper for Chesterfield and Rochdale.

References

Chesterfield F.C. players
Rochdale A.F.C. players
Footballers from Sheffield
English footballers
1895 births
1980 deaths
Association footballers not categorized by position